Herbert Sylvester Clements (November 8, 1865 – November 30, 1939) was a Canadian politician.

Born in Dover Township, Canada West, a manufacturer and farmer, he was first elected to the House of Commons of Canada in the 1904 federal election for the Ontario electoral district of Kent West. A Conservative, he was defeated in 1908. He was elected in the 1911 elections for the British Columbia riding of Comox—Atlin. He was re-elected in 1917 to the redistributed seat, then named Comox-Alberni, where he was defeated in 1921.

Legacy
The Village of Port Clements, British Columbia, in the Queen Charlotte Islands, is named for him (the islands were part of Comox-Atlin).

References
 
 The Canadian Parliament; biographical sketches and photo-engravures of the senators and members of the House of Commons of Canada. Being the tenth Parliament, elected November 3, 1904

1865 births
1939 deaths
Conservative Party of Canada (1867–1942) MPs
Members of the House of Commons of Canada from British Columbia
Members of the House of Commons of Canada from Ontario